The Campeonato Catarinense de Futebol Profissional da Série A de 2020, known as the 2020 Campeonato Catarinense, was the 95th season of Santa Catarina's top-flight football league. The season began on 22 January and ended on 13 September 2020.

On 16 March 2020, FCF suspended the Campeonato Catarinense indefinitely due to the COVID-19 pandemic in Brazil. Complying with the guidelines of the Governo do Estado de Santa Catarina, the tournament resumed behind closed doors on 8 July 2020.

After the quarter-final first legs, played on 8 and 9 July 2020, several players and staff of Chapecoense, Criciúma, Figueirense, Joinville, and Marcílio Dias tested positive for COVID-19. Because of this, on 13 July 2020, the Governo de Santa Catarina and FCF suspended the tournament until 27 July 2020. Due to the spread of COVID-19, on 24 July 2020, the Governo de Santa Catarina extended the suspension until 7 August 2020, but a subsequent agreement between FCF and the Governo de Santa Catarina lifted the suspension. Finally, the tournament resumed again on 29 July 2020.

In the finals, Chapecoense defeated Brusque 3–0 on aggregate to win their seventh title.

Avaí were the defending champions but they were eliminated in the quarter-finals.

Format
The tournament was contested between 10 teams, who first played in a single round-robin tournament. The bottom two teams played a relegation play-off to next year's Série B. The final stage and the relegation play-off were played on a home-and-away two-legged basis. Champions and runners-up qualified for the 2021 Copa do Brasil, while three teams qualified for the 2021 Campeonato Brasileiro Série D.

Participating teams

First stage

Table and Results

Relegation play-off
The play-off was played on a home-and-away two-legged basis, with the higher-seeded hosting the second leg. If tied on aggregate the lower-seeded would be relegated.

|}

Matches 

Tubarão were relegated.

Notes

Final stage
Starting from the quarter-finals, the teams played a single-elimination tournament. The matches were played on a home-and-away two-legged basis, with the higher-seeded team hosting the second leg. If tied on aggregate, the penalty shoot-out would be used to determine the winner.

Bracket

Quarter-finals

|}

Group A

Chapecoense qualified for the semi-finals.

Group B

Brusque qualified for the semi-finals.

Group C

Juventus qualified for the semi-finals.

Group D

Criciúma qualified for the semi-finals.

Notes

Semi-finals

|}

Group F

Chapecoense qualified for the finals.

Group G

Brusque qualified for the finals.

Finals

|}

Group H

General table

Top goalscorers

References

Campeonato Catarinense seasons
Campeonato Catarinense